Dinoponera hispida (hispida, from the Latin hispidus: bristle, referring to the conspicuous bristle-like setae covering the body) is a queenless species of ants in the subfamily Ponerinae. The species is known only from the type locality in Tucuruí, Pará, Brazil.

Description
Workers can be distinguished from other species by the following combination of character states: conspicuous bristle-like setae covering the entire body but most pronounced on the dorsum of the head, mesosoma, petiole and gaster; fine striations on dorsum of the head; integument smooth and shiny with bluish luster most visible on sides of the head; antero–inferior corner of pronotum without tooth-like process; petiole bulging at antero-dorsal corner; insertions of setae on dorsum of petiole raised, papillate.

Males are unknown.

References

Ponerinae
Insects described in 2013
Hymenoptera of South America